"Do It ('Til You're Satisfied)" is a popular song by funk group B. T. Express, written by songwriter Billy Nichols.

Background
Released from the debut album of the same title, the song became a great "crossover" success.  The song is noted for its hand claps at the beginning, as well as the spoken portion in the middle of the song.  The short version was less than 3 minutes, while the long version is over 5 minutes in length. This song was considered suggestive of sexual intercourse, especially for the repeated lines in the coda section: "I'm Satisfied".

Chart performance
The single went #1 to the R&B singles chart for a week during the autumn of 1974 and went to #2 on the Billboard Hot 100 singles chart for two weeks.("Whatever Gets You thru the Night" by John Lennon and "I Can Help" by Billy Swan kept the song from the #1 spot).  "Do It ('Til You're Satisfied)" was an early disco hit peaking at number eight on the disco/dance charts.

Weekly charts

Year-end charts

In popular culture
The song was used as the opening theme for the late night talk show The Mo'Nique Show weeknights on Black Entertainment Television, and was featured in the episode "Hyde's Father" (season 3, episode 3) of That '70s Show. The song appeared in the 2013 video game Grand Theft Auto V in the radio station The Lowdown 91.1.

Samples
The single was one of three sampled in the 2002 song "Addictive" by Truth Hurts featuring Rakim.

References

External links

 

1974 singles
Disco songs
1974 songs
Scepter Records singles
B. T. Express songs
Songs written by Billy Nicholls